The Japan (hosts) and Saudi Arabia (holders) qualified automatically for the 1992 AFC Asian Cup. Six other teams had to qualify for the event, scheduled from 29 October to 8 November. There were a total number of 20 participating teams in the qualifying tournament.

Qualification

Group 1 
All matches in Doha, Qatar

Group 2 
All matches in Al Ain, UAE

Group 3 
All matches in Kolkata, India
 and  withdrew

Group 4 
All matches in Pyongyang, Korea DPR

Group 5 
All matches in Singapore

Group 6 
All matches in Bangkok, Thailand

Qualified teams

References

External links
RSSSF details

Q
AFC Asian Cup qualification